Ferdiš Duša (13 January 1888 in Frýdlant nad Ostravicí – 1958 ibidem) was a Czech folk painter, graphic artist, illustrator and manufacturer of ceramics, coming from the borderland between Moravia and Silesia.

Biography 
Duša did not receive any artistic education and can therefore be called an autodidact. He liked traveling and visited, among other countries, Italy, Germany, Slovakia, Switzerland and the Ukraine. In 1910 he started to work in a ceramics factory in the city of Rožnov pod Radhoštěm (in the Moravian-Silesian Beskids), but later failed in his attempts to establish an own enterprise.
In 1927 he moved to Prague, where he further developed his artistic talent. He became a member of the Hollar association of Czech graphic artists, with the help of which he several times exhibited his pictures. In 1955 he returned to his birthplace of Frýdlant nad Ostravicí.

The elaboration of social themes is frequently found in his graphical work, the inspiration for which he drew from events of the 1920s and 1930s. In addition, he photographed and wrote love poems.

Notable works 
 Těšínsko – Region of Těšín/Tetschen (1920) 
 Smutná země – A sad country (1922)
 Dolů Váhom – Down the Váh river (1933)
 Tatry – Tatra Mountains (1936)
 Na haldě – In the slag heap
 Důlní neštěstí – Mining disaster

Literature
 PELIKÁNOVÁ, Gabriela; KAHÁNKOVÁ, Taťána, Rodáci a významné osobnosti Moravskoslezského kraje . Ostrava, Moravian-Silesian Region, 2006. Ostrava : Moravskoslezský kraj, 2006. S. 11 S. 11.

See also
List of Czech painters

References

Czech graphic designers
Czech illustrators
1888 births
1958 deaths
People from Frýdlant nad Ostravicí
20th-century Czech painters
Czech male painters
20th-century Czech male artists